Tutku Açık (born September 1, 1980) is a Turkish professional basketball coach and former player. He played the point guard position. He is currently the head coach for Gaziantep Basketbol of the Turkish Basketball Super League.

International career
Tutku Açık had been called to Turkish national team for several times.

References

External links
 TBLStat.net Player Profile
 Euroleague.net Profile

1980 births
Living people
Basketbol Süper Ligi head coaches
Beşiktaş men's basketball players
Galatasaray S.K. (men's basketball) players
Point guards
Trabzonspor B.K. players
Turkish men's basketball players
Türk Telekom B.K. players
Ülker G.S.K. basketball players